Opuntia polyacantha is a common species of cactus known by the common names plains pricklypear, starvation pricklypear,. and hairspine cactus, panhandle pricklypear.  It is native to North America, where it is widespread in Western Canada, the Great Plains, the central and Western United States, and Chihuahua in northern Mexico. In 2018, a disjunct population was discovered in the Thousand Islands region of Ontario, Canada.

Habitat 
This cactus grows in a wide variety of habitat types, including sagebrush, Ponderosa pine forest, prairie, savanna, shrublands, shrubsteppe, chaparral, pinyon-juniper woodland, and scrub. Individual plants tend to thrive in sandy soil. A new plant can grow from a displaced stem segment.

Description
Its areoles are tipped with woolly brown fibers and glochids. Many of the areoles have spines which are quite variable in size and shape. They may be  in length, stout or thin, straight or curling, and any of a variety of colors.

Flowers grow from spine-covered stem segments which are shaped like semi-flattened pears. The fruit is cylindrical, brownish, dry and spiny. The cactus reproduces by seed, by layering, and by resprouting from detached segments.

There are many expressions of O. polyacantha and variation is common. Multiple varieties have been proposed. Some are accepted by modern authorities and some require further study.

Uses
Native Americans used it as a medicinal plant, with different parts treating various symptoms.

This pricklypear provides food for many types of animals. It provides over half the winter food for the black-tailed prairie dog in one area. Pronghorn antelope eat it, especially after the spines are burned off in wildfires. Ranchers intentionally burn stands of the plant to make it palatable for livestock when little other food is available. It will also grow in waste areas where good forage will not take hold. In fact, an abundance of the cactus indicates land that is poor in quality.

Several insects attack the cactus, including the cactus moth Melitara dentata, the blue cactus borer Olycella subumbrella, and the cactus bug Chelinidea vittiger.

O. polyacantha provided the Lewis and Clark Expedition with opportunity for admiration and more often complaint about the plant.

With the skin and seeds removed, the fruit can be eaten raw or made into candy.

References

External links

Jepson eFlora (TJM2): Opuntia polyacantha
Species account and photographs from Lady Bird Johnson Wildflower Center Native Plant Information Network (NPIN)
Opuntia polyacantha — UC CalPhotos Gallery 
Opuntia polyacantha photo gallery at Opuntia Web

polyacantha
Cacti of Canada
Cacti of Mexico
Cacti of the United States
Flora of the Great Plains (North America)
Flora of the Southwestern United States
Flora of the Northwestern United States
Flora of Western Canada
Flora of California
Flora of the California desert regions
Flora of Chihuahua (state)
Flora of the Sierra Nevada (United States)
Flora of Texas
Natural history of the Mojave Desert
Plants used in traditional Native American medicine
Plant dyes